Hadi Kazemi (b. 1976) is an Iranian actor, narrator, sculptor, painter and photographer. 
He is known for his roles as Nezam Du Barareh in comedy series Barareh Nights, and Baba Shah in Bitter Coffee, both television series directed by Mehran Modiri.

Biography 

Hadi Kazemi is the second oldest of four brothers. Hadi graduated from the Malek-Ashtar University of Technology with a diploma in graphic design and later on went to get his bachelor's degree in acting from the Tehran University of Art. He has other than his career in film and television been an active photographer and has shown his work in several photography exhibitions throughout the years. 
On the side, Hadi works with two of his brothers Hamed and Tohid Kazemi with their duo music group D,Kr.

Filmography

Film 

Khab Foroosh, 2009 
Shab Be Yade Mandani, 2010
Kolahbardar, 2010
Kar-e Kazeb, Morad, 2010 
50 Kilo Albaloo, 2016' 
Iran Berger, 2015

Television 

Pavarchin, 2002
Mehman-e Madarbozorg, 2003
Sefr Darajeh, 2004
Shabekeye Se-o-nim, 2004
Shabhaye Barareh, 2005 - 2006 - Nezam Du Barareh
Faza Navardan, 2007 - Various Characters
Baghe Mozaffar, 2007 - Nima
Mahe Asal, 2007 - Barat
Dar Cheshm-e Baad, 2008
Bi Tabi, 2009 
Marde Do Hezar Chehreh, 2009 
Sefid Emza, 2010
Ghahve-ye Talkh, 2010 - Baba Shah
Bahaneyi Baraye Boodan, 2011
Bidar Bash, 2012
Vilaye Man, 2012 Khatoon Abadi
I'm Just Kidding, 2013
King of Ear, 2013 Zohreh
Salhaye Door Az Khane , 2019 Zohreh
Zaferani, 2016 Mashallah
Aspirin, 2016 Farhad
Alalbadal, 2017 Khorram

References

Hadi kazemi in red carpet

Hadi Kazemi interview  

The story of Hadi Kazemi's acquaintance and his wife

movies Hadi Kazemi

Hadi Kazemi in Khandevane ( Tv Show )

Hadi Kazem in Fajr Festival

External links
 
 Hadi Kazemi' On Instagram

Living people
Iranian comedians
People from Tehran
Iranian male film actors
Iranian male television actors
Year of birth missing (living people)